The year 1592 in science and technology involved some significant events.

Astronomy
 November–December – Appearance of the Guest stars observed by Korean astronomers.

Biology
 Prospero Alpini publishes De Plantis Aegypti liber in Venice.

Geography
 August 9 – English explorer John Davis, commander of the Desire, probably discovers the Falkland Islands.
 An abridgement of Muhammad al-Idrisi's 12th-century geographical compilation is published as De geographia universali or Kitāb Nuzhat al-mushtāq fī dhikr al-amṣār wa-al-aqṭār wa-al-buldān wa-al-juzur wa-al-madā’ in wa-al-āfāq in Rome.

Mathematics
 March 14 – Ultimate 'Pi Day': the largest correspondence between calendar dates and significant digits of pi since the introduction of the Julian calendar.

Physics
 Galileo invents the  thermometer.

Technology
 March – Korean Admiral Yi Sun-sin perfects the armed turtle ship.

Institutions
 Trinity College Dublin is established.

Births
 April 22 – Wilhelm Schickard, German inventor of the first mechanical calculator (died 1635)

Deaths
 May – Sir Thomas Cavendish, English explorer (born 1560)
 October 14 - Urbain Hémard, French physician and dentist (born circa 1548)
 Pedro Sarmiento de Gamboa, Spanish explorer and scientist (born 1532)

References

 
16th century in science
1590s in science